La Chapelle-Caro is a former commune in the Morbihan department of Brittany in north-western France. On 1 January 2016, it was merged into the new commune Val d'Oust. Its population was 1,442 in 2019. Inhabitants of La Chapelle-Caro are called in French Chapellois.

See also
Communes of the Morbihan department

References

External links

Former communes of Morbihan
Populated places disestablished in 2016